Daniel Powter (also known as DP) is the self-titled second studio album by Canadian singer-songwriter Daniel Powter, released on July 26, 2005, in Canada and on April 11, 2006, in the United States. The album debuted at No. 9 on the Billboard 200 with 89,213 copies sold that week. As of July 12, 2006, Daniel Powter has sold 464,136 copies in the U.S. The album debuted on the Japanese Oricon charts at number 242. However, the album slowly climbed the charts and eventually peaked at number four. The album eventually became the eighteenth best-selling album of 2006 in Japan with 584,000 copies sold and was the highest-ranked Western album on the year-end chart. The album was certified gold in the U.S. on May 24, 2006.

Critical reception
Daniel Powter was met with "mixed or average" reviews from critics. At Metacritic, which assigns a weighted average rating out of 100 to reviews from mainstream publications, this release received an average score of 54 based on 11 reviews.

In a review for AllMusic, critic reviewer Stephen Thomas Erlewine wrote: "Nevertheless, as a record - as a series of expertly produced, expertly recorded adult pop tunes - Daniel Powter is a debut that's easy to enjoy, thanks to Powter's melodic skills and sweet voice." At Rolling Stone, Barry Walters said: "Lacking the star personality of a Robbie Williams or the wit of a Ben Folds, Powter doesn't rise above his instantly familiar keyboard riffs, yet neither does he drown in them. Instead he rides the hooks that propelled "Bad Day" from its background use in American Idol to the charts, while producer Mitchell Froom supplies the ear candy."

Track listing

AUDIO (In High-Resolution Stereo)

B-Sides

 "Bad Day" (Acoustic Version- Recorded for NRJ)
 "Styrofoam" (Live at La Cigale, Paris)
 "Free Loop" (Live at La Cigale, Paris)
 "Song 6" (Live in Vienna for Hitradio Ö3)
 "Bad Day" (Live in Vienna for Hitradio Ö3)
 "Stupid Like This"

VIDEO

Music Videos

 "Bad Day"
 "Jimmy Gets High"
 "Free Loop"
 "Lie to Me"

Live From "Studio A"

 "Free Loop"
 "Bad Day"
 "Styrofoam"
 "Wasted"
 "Back on the Streets"
 "Stupid Like This"
 "Song 6" (Solo)
 "Free Loop" (Solo)

Singles
 "Bad Day" was released on June 27, 2005, in Australia and on July 25 in the United Kingdom and features two b-sides: a non-album track, "Stupid Like This", and "Lost On the Stoop".
 "Free Loop" was released on November 7, 2005, in the United Kingdom, where it was later deemed ineligible to chart.
 "Jimmy Gets High" was released in 2005 in Canada. A music video was in rotation on MuchMoreMusic.
 "Lie to Me" was released on April 17, 2006, in the United Kingdom, where it debuted and peaked at No. 40 due to more complications.
 "Love You Lately" was released to iTunes in the United States on September 19, 2006, and went for U.S. Adult Contemporary + Hot Adult Contemporary adds on October 16. It was the second U.S. single for Powter from a re-release/deluxe edition of his self-titled album.

Personnel

Musicians
 Daniel Powter – vocals, piano, keyboards
 Matt Chamberlain – drums
 Brendan Ostrander – drums
 Darren Parris – bass
 Davey Faragher – bass
 Mitchell Froom – keyboards
 Jeff Dawson – guitar
 Val McCallum – guitar

Production
 Jeff Dawson – producer, engineer
 Mitchell Froom – producer
 Bob Ludwig – mastering
 David Boucher – engineer, mixing

Charts

Weekly charts

Year-end charts

Certifications

Release history

References

External links
 Official Daniel Powter website

2005 debut albums
Daniel Powter albums
Warner Records albums
Albums produced by Mitchell Froom